HMS Etrusco was launched in 1789 at Rhode Island as President Washington. Home Riggs Popham purchased her at Calcutta and transferred to her the name and papers of a previous vessel of his named Etrusco, a Tuscan ship.

Career
Merchantman: Between 1787 and 1793 Popham was engaged in a series of commercial ventures in the Eastern Sea, sailing for the Imperial Ostend Company. During this time he took several surveys and rendered some services to the British East India Company, which were officially acknowledged. 

In December 1791 he purchased at Calcutta and fitted out an American ship, President Washington,  at a cost of about £20,000. He named his purchase Etrusco, transferring to President Washington the name and papers of his previous ship. She therefore sailed under the flag of the Duke of Tuscany.
 
Popham sailed Etrusco to China and took on board a cargo valued at £50,000, the property of himself and two merchants, apparently French. He also took on the freight charge, which he valued at £40,000. Etrusco arrived at Ostend in  July 1793, where the English frigate  seized her and then brought her back to England.

Etrusco was claimed as a prize for having French property on board, and condemned as a droit of admiralty for infringing the British East India Company's (EIC) monopoly by bringing tea from China.

Etrusco first appeared in Lloyd's Register (LR) in 1794 with B. Georgi, master, Popham, owner, and trade Cork–Hamburg.

Royal Navy: The Admiralty purchased Etrusco in 1794. Commander James Hanson commissioned her as HMS Etrusco in May 1795; she was registered on 29 June 1795. Commander George Reynolds replaced Hanson in September 1797.

Loss
Etrusco was part of a convoy from Martinique to England when a storm on 23 July 1798 dismasted her completely. Her timbers were already in a poor state before she had left the West Indies and after the storm and the loss of her masts she was now leaking. Commander Reynolds fired three of her 6-pounder guns downwards through her bottom to scuttle her and then left her.

Lloyd's List reported that the armed ship Etrusco, from the West Indies, had foundered on 25 August in a gale of wind but that her crew had been saved.

Notes, citations, and references
Notes

Citations

References
 
  
 

1789 ships
Ships built in Rhode Island
Age of Sail merchant ships of England
Sailing ships of Italy
Merchant ships of Italy
Storeships of the Royal Navy
Maritime incidents in 1798
Scuttled vessels
Shipwrecks in the Atlantic Ocean